Leon Wieseltier (born June 14, 1952) is an American critic and magazine editor. From 1983 to 2014, he was the literary editor of The New Republic. He was a contributing editor and critic at The Atlantic until October 27, 2017, when the magazine fired him following allegations and an admission by Wiesenltier of multiple instances of sexual harassment. He is currently the editor of Liberties.

Life and career
Wieseltier was born in Brooklyn, New York, the son of Stella (Backenroth) and Mark Wieseltier, who were Holocaust survivors from Poland. He attended the Yeshiva of Flatbush, Columbia University, Oxford University, and Harvard University. He was a member of the Harvard Society of Fellows (1979–82).

During his tenure as literary editor of The New Republic, Wieseltier played a central role in the increased stature of its "back of the book" or literary, cultural and arts pages, which he edited. The magazine's owner, Marty Peretz discovered Wieseltier, then working at Harvard's Society of Fellows, and installed him in charge of the section. Wieseltier reinvented the section along the lines of The New York Review of Books, allowing his critics, many of them academics, to write longer, critical essays instead of simple book reviews. Media critic Eric Alterman has called the selection of Wieseltier "probably [...] Peretz's single most significant positive achievement" in running the magazine. During other changes of editors, Wieseltier remained as cultural editor. Under him the section was "simultaneously erudite and zestful."

Wieseltier has published several books of fiction and nonfiction. Kaddish, a National Book Award finalist in 2000, and a National Jewish Book Award winner in the Nonfiction category in 1998, is a genre-blending meditation on the Jewish prayers of mourning. Against Identity is a collection of thoughts about the modern notion of identity.

Wieseltier also edited and introduced a volume of works by Lionel Trilling entitled The Moral Obligation to Be Intelligent and wrote the foreword to Ann Weiss's The Last Album: Eyes from the Ashes of Auschwitz-Birkenau, a collection of personal photographs that serves as a paean to pre-Shoah innocence.

Wieseltier's translations of the works of Israeli poet Yehuda Amichai have appeared in The New Republic and The New Yorker.

Wieseltier served on the Committee for the Liberation of Iraq and was a prominent and outspoken advocate of the Iraq War. "I am in no sense a neoconservative, as many of my neoconservative adversaries will attest," Wieseltier wrote in a May 2007 letter to Judge Reggie Walton, seeking leniency for his friend Scooter Libby.

In 2013, he was the recipient of the Dan David Prize for being "a foremost writer and thinker who confronts and engages with the central issues of our times, setting the standard for serious cultural discussion in the United States".

In January 2016, it was reported that Wieseltier would be joining Laurene Powell Jobs to form a new publication devoted to exploring the effects of technology on people's lives. But Powell Jobs withdrew funding for the journal on October 24, 2017 after Wieseltier admitted to sexual harassment and inappropriate advances with several former female employees. Jobs said in a formal statement: “Upon receiving information related to past inappropriate workplace conduct, Emerson Collective ended its business relationship with Leon Wieseltier, including a journal planned for publication under his editorial direction. The production and distribution of the journal has been ended.”

He was also fired by the Brookings Institution and is no longer an Isaiah Berlin Senior Fellow in Culture and Policy.

Sexual harassment acknowledgment 
In the aftermath of Harvey Weinstein allegations and the #MeToo movement, a list of "Shitty Media Men" including Wieseltier, was widely shared and featured men in the media industry who were accused of sexual misconduct.

After it was revealed on October 24, 2017 that several former women employees of The New Republic had accused Wieseltier of sexual harassment and inappropriate advances, he admitted to "offenses against some of my colleagues in the past."

In a statement he made after the allegations became public, Wiseltier said: “I am ashamed to know that I made [anyone]... feel demeaned and disrespected. I assure them that I will not waste this reckoning.” 

According to The New York Times: "Several women... said they were humiliated when Mr. Wieseltier sloppily kissed them on the mouth, sometimes in front of other staff members. Others said he discussed his sex life, once describing the breasts of a former girlfriend in detail. Mr. Wieseltier made passes at female staffers, they said, and pressed them for details about their own sexual encounters. Mr. Wieseltier often commented on what women wore to the office, the former staff members said, telling them that their dresses were not tight enough. One woman said he left a note on her desk thanking her for the miniskirt she wore to the office that day. She said she never wore a skirt to the office again".

Another woman who was harassed by Wieseltier, Sarah Wildman, a former assistant editor of the magazine, has written that she was fired for complaining: "In disclosing this incident to my superiors, the outcome was, in many ways, far worse than the act itself. It’s not exactly that I was disbelieved; it’s that in the end, I was dismissed," she wrote in Vox.

Wildman further wrote that the sexual harassment went hand in hand with gender discrimination at the magazine during Peretz's and Wieseltier's tenure: "The women knew we had a far shallower chance of rising up the masthead than our male counterparts; all of us hoped we’d be the exception. To do so, we entered into a game in which the rules were rigged against us, sometimes pushing us well past our point of comfort in order to remain in play."

Criticism
Wieseltier was a frequent target of the satirical monthly Spy magazine. It often derided his analyses of pop culture as comically pretentious and mocked him as "Leon Vee-ZEL-tee-AY" who "jealously guards his highbrow credentials while wearing a lowbrow heart on his sleeve".

In reference to being called a "Jew-baiter" by Wieseltier, Andrew Sullivan has said, "Wieseltier is a connoisseur and cultivator of personal hatred"—referring to a dislike based on "tedious" causes that Wieseltier allegedly has held regarding him for a long time.

Wiesltier was the subject of a 2017 essay, "The Tzaddick of the Intellectuals" written by Joseph Epstein that appeared in The Weekly Standard (November 3, 2017) and was included in Gallimaufry (book) a collection of Epstein's essays published in 2020.  See also Tzadik.

Personal life
Wieseltier and Mahnaz Ispahani married in 1985, and divorced in 1994. Justice Ruth Bader Ginsburg officiated at their wedding in 1985. 

After a long-term relationship with choreographer Twyla Tharp, he married his second wife, Jennifer Bradley, who worked on urban-development issues at the Brookings Institution. The Washington Post reported that Supreme Court Justice Ruth Bader Ginsburg would also officiate at their October 2000 wedding.  As of 2020, the couple was in the midst of a divorce. 

Wieseltier is a fluent Hebrew speaker, and when interviewed in Israel, he said "I feel perfectly at home here."

In popular culture

Wieseltier appeared in one episode of the fifth season of The Sopranos, playing Stewart Silverman, a character whom Wieseltier described as "a derangingly materialistic co-religionist who dreams frantically of 'Wedding of the Week' and waits a whole year for some stupid car in which he can idle for endless hours in traffic east of Quogue every weekend of every summer, the vulgar Zegna-swaddled brother of a Goldman Sachs mandarin whose son's siman tov u'mazel tov is provided by a pulchritudinous and racially diverse bunch of shellfish-eating chicks in tight off-the-shoulder gowns".

References

External links

1952 births
Jewish American writers
Living people
American literary critics
American male journalists
American magazine editors
Columbia College (New York) alumni
Harvard University alumni
Harvard Fellows
The New Republic people
20th-century American non-fiction writers
21st-century American non-fiction writers
Writers from Brooklyn
Journalists from New York City
Sexual harassment in the United States
20th-century American male writers
21st-century American male writers
21st-century American Jews